Carrodano (locally ) is a comune (municipality) in the Province of La Spezia in the Italian region Liguria, located about  southeast of Genoa and about  northwest of La Spezia.

Carrodano borders the following municipalities: Borghetto di Vara, Carro, Deiva Marina, Framura, Levanto, Sesta Godano.

Demographic evolution

References

Cities and towns in Liguria